Gravelly Point is a geographic cape extending into Otsego Lake in Middlefield, New York. The point is not accessible from land but only the lake.

Appearance in literature
Gravelley Point is mentioned in chapter seven of The Deerslayer. Natty Bumppo was paddling after his drifting canoe, and once he reaches it he landed on Gravelly Point. When he lands on the point he is fired upon by a Huron Indian who wants to seize the canoe, and Deerslayer returned fire. As the Huron was dying, he asked Deerslayer what his name was. Deerslayer replied to him, that he was called Deerslayer though when he returned from war he shall gain a more manly title. The Huron said that it was a good name for a boy but not a warrior, and he then said "No Deerslayer... Hawkeye, Hawkeye, Hawkeye". The Huron then died and Deerslayer gained a new name, but continued to be referred to as Deerslayer throughout the novel.

References

Landforms of Otsego County, New York